May I Come In? is a 1964 studio album by Blossom Dearie, arranged by Jack Marshall.

Track listing 
 "Something Happens to Me" (Marvin Fisher, Jack Segal) – 2:02
 "I'm in Love Again" (Cy Coleman, Peggy Lee, Bill Schluger) – 2:45
 "When Sunny Gets Blue" (Fisher, Segal) – 2:09
 "Quiet Nights of Quiet Stars" (Antônio Carlos Jobim, Gene Lees) – 2:52
 "Don't Wait Too Long" (Sunny Skylar) – 2:16
 "I Wish You Love" (Albert A. Beach, Charles Trenet) – 2:06
 "Charade" (Henry Mancini, Johnny Mercer) – 1:54
 "May I Come In?" (Fisher, Segal) – 2:13
 "I'm Old Fashioned" (Jerome Kern, Mercer) – 2:31
 "Love Is a Necessary Evil" (Fisher, Segal) – 2:26
 "The Best Is Yet to Come" (Coleman, Carolyn Leigh) – 2:48
 "Put on a Happy Face" (Lee Adams, Charles Strouse) – 2:12

Personnel 
 Blossom Dearie – vocal, piano
 Jack Marshall – arranger, conductor

References 

1964 albums
Blossom Dearie albums
Capitol Records albums
Albums conducted by Jack Marshall
Albums produced by Dave Cavanaugh